Bob Mamet is an American composer and musician.  He is the paternal half-brother of playwright David Mamet.

Select discography
White Phantom (1987)
Necromancer (1988)
Aftershock (1990)
Lockdown (1990)
Caged in Paradiso (1990)
Lakeboat (2000)

References

External links
 
 

Living people
21st-century American composers
20th-century American composers
Year of birth missing (living people)